St Lawrence's Church, St Lawrence is a parish church in the Church of England located in St Lawrence, Isle of Wight.  It is recorded in the National Heritage List for England as a designated Grade II* listed building.

History

The church was built in 1878 to a design by Sir George Gilbert Scott. and consists of a nave, chancel, north aisle, porch and western turret with eight bells, cast in 1935.

Organ

A specification of the organ can be found on the National Pipe Organ Register.

References

Church of England church buildings on the Isle of Wight
Grade II* listed churches on the Isle of Wight
George Gilbert Scott buildings